Vilniaus Geležinis Vilkas is a Lithuanian football club from Vilnius.

Participation in Lithuanian Championships
 2003 – 2nd (1 Lyga)
 2004 – 4th (1 Lyga)
 2005 – 5th (1 Lyga)

Football clubs in Lithuania
Football clubs in Vilnius
Sport in Vilnius
1989 establishments in Lithuania
Association football clubs established in 1989